Orin de Waard (born 4 December 1983) is a Curaçaoan former footballer who played as a forward.

Club career
De Waard played for a number of amateur club sides in the Netherlands

International career
On 2 September 2011 he made his debut for the Curaçao national football team in a World Cup 2014 Qualifier against Antigua and Barbuda national football team

References

1983 births
Living people
Curaçao footballers
Curaçao international footballers
Association football forwards
Achilles '29 players
JVC Cuijk players
De Treffers players
FC Lienden players
People from Den Helder